Rowing competitions at the 2022 South American Games in Asuncion, Paraguay were held between October 2 and 5, 2022 at the Bahía de Asunción - Club Mbiguá

Schedule
The competition schedule is as follows:

Medal summary

Medal table

Medalists

Men

Women

Participation
Eight nations participated in rowing events of the 2022 South American Games.

References

Rowing
South American Games
2022